Robert Stewart, 1st Marquess of Londonderry PC (Ire) (1739–1821), was a County Down landowner, Irish Volunteer, and member of the parliament who, exceptionally for an Ulster Scot and Presbyterian, rose within the ranks of Ireland's "Anglican Ascendancy." His success was fuelled by wealth acquired through judicious marriages, and by the advancing political career of his son, Viscount Castlereagh (an architect of the Acts of Union, and British Foreign Secretary). In 1798 he gained notoriety for refusing to intercede on behalf of James Porter, his local Presbyterian minister, executed outside the Stewart demesne as a rebel.

Birth and origins 
Robert was born on 27 September 1739, at Mount Stewart, the eldest son of Alexander Stewart and his wife Mary Cowan. His father was an alderman of Derry in 1760, and his grandfather, Colonel William Stewart, had commanded one of the two companies of Protestant soldiers that Derry admitted into its walls when Mountjoy was sent there by Tyrconnell before the start of the siege. Robert's mother was a daughter of John Cowan, also an alderman of that same town. His parents had married on 30 June 1737 in Dublin.

Cowan inheritance 
Within three months of his parents' marriage in 1737, Robert's mother inherited the fortune her half-brother, Robert Cowan, had acquired in service to the East India Company as Governor of Bombay.  The legacy allowed Alexander Stewart to retire from the linen trade and buy into the landed gentry.  In 1743 he purchased sixty townlands and a large estate from the Colville family at Newtownards and Comber in County Down.

Education and first marriage 
Robert Stewart was brought up a Calvinist, sent by his father under the care of a tutor to the University of Geneva, where he studied literature. He thus "temptations of Oxford and similar academic strongholds of the Established Church" to which, as the son landed gentry, he might naturally have been drawn.

On his return from the continent, he courted Lady Sarah Frances Seymour-Conway (whose niece, Mary Moore, married Robert's brother Alexander in 1791). Lady Sarah Frances Seymour-Conway's father, Francis Seymour-Conway, 1st Marquess of Hertford, owned considerable property in the neighbourhood of Lisburn, and in 1765 was appointed Lord Lieutenant of Ireland. Robert Stewart attended the viceregal court in Dublin, where he successfully pressed his suit. The marriage took place in the Chapel Royal of Dublin Castle, and Lord Hertford housed the new couple in the city.

 
Robert and Sarah had two sons:
Alexander-Francis, who died within his first year
Robert (1769–1822), later to be known as "Castlereagh", the famous statesman

Lady Sarah died in childbirth in 1770.

Opposition member of parliament 
The year following his wife's death Robert Stewart entered the Irish House of Commons as member for County Down filling a vacancy created by the elevation of  Bernard Ward to the House of Lords as Baron Bangor. He was returned by the "independent" or "county" interest backed by the local Whigs and by his fellow Presbyterians ("Dissenters" from the Established Church who were a majority among the county's exceptionally high number of freeholder voters), as opposed to the "official" or  "court" of the Earl of Hillsborough, the county's Lord-Lieutenant and largest proprietor.

This political triumph over the interests of an Ascendancy family which had hitherto returned both county members to the Irish House of Commons formed the prelude of a long period of rivalry. Robert Stewart's initial success was largely due to popular sympathy with John Wilkes and the discontented American colonists, and to the growing feelings in favour of constitutional and parliamentary reform which found expression in the Volunteer movement.

He proved a consistent antagonist of the administration, invariably voting and sometimes speaking for the Opposition in the House. His early political conduct won the approval of his constituents. A dinner at which they entertained in Belfast was marked by toasts "liberal in quality as in quantity", including to  "The memory of John Hampden" (who had led parliamentary opposition to Charles I), and to "All those who would rather die in jack-boots than live in wooden shoes".

Second marriage and children 
Robert Stewart remarried, on 7 June 1775, taking for his second wife, Frances Pratt, the independent-minded daughter of the Whig politician Charles Pratt, 1st Earl Camden.

From his second marriage he had 11 more children, three sons and eight daughters:
Charles William (1778–1854), succeeded him as 3rd Marquess
Frances Ann (1777–1810), married Lord Charles Fitzroy
Elizabeth Mary (1779–1798)
Caroline (1781–1860), married Col. Thomas Wood MP
 Alexander John (1783–1800)
Georgiana (1785–1804), married the politician George Canning, 1st Baron Garvagh, nephew of army general and politician Brent Spencer
Selina Sarah Juliana (1786–1871),  David Guardi Ker MP for Downpatrick
Matilda Charlotte (1787–1842), married Edward Michael Ward, the eldest son of the Robert Ward of Bangor
Emily Jane (1789–1865), married firstly John James, son of Sir Walter James James, 1st Baronet, and secondly Henry Hardinge, 1st Viscount Hardinge
 Thomas Henry (1790–1810)
Octavia (1792–1819), married Edward Law, 1st Earl of Ellenborough

Irish Volunteer

Between 1775 and 1783, Robert Stewart lived in Bangor with his wife, while his father was living at Mount Stewart.

In 1776, a general election was held in Ireland. Robert Stewart stood again for Down and was re-elected. He sat until the dissolution of this parliament on 25 July 1783.

Stewart participated in the Irish Volunteers, the self-armed militia ostensibly formed to maintain order and defend Ireland while the Crown and its forces were distracted by the American War. Following the raid on Belfast Lough by the American privateer John Paul Jones in April 1778, Stewart organised a volunteer company in Newtownards of 115 men, the Arms Independents, to act as fencibles, but which, like other companies, were soon engaged in patriotic debate.

Alexander Stewart, died on 2 April 1781 and as his heir he moved into the family seat, Mount Stewart, near Newtownards (where in the park he completed the Temple of the Winds). On 17 September 1782 he was sworn to the Irish Privy Council.

That very same month as Colonel Stewart he was elected president of the second Ulster (overwhelmingly Presbyterian) Volunteer Convention in Dungannon.

Anticipating a "grand national convention" called for Dublin in November, it notably failed to broaden the front against the Ascendancy. Resolutions in support of Catholic enfranchisement were rejected.

In the general election of October Stewart stood again for County Down but the Ascendancy families triumphed, one seat taken by Arthur Hill, the son of the Earl of Downshire, the other by Lord Bangor's son, Edward Ward. Stewart unsuccessfully challenged the returns at the bar of the House of Commons claiming irregularities. Downshire's influence was able to procure the dismissal of his petition with costs".

At the Dublin convention, Stewart was appointed chairman of the committee "for the receiving and digesting plans of reform". But the convention tactic did not succeed as in 1781, when the massed ranks of the Volunteers had helped secure Irish legislative independence. The digested bill, presented by Henry Flood, which would have abolished the proprietary boroughs (with which their Ascendancy rivals, but not the Stewarts, were endowed) and extended the vote to a broader class of Protestant freeholders was rejected. Having accepted defeat in America, Britain could again spare troops for Ireland, and neither parliament nor Dublin Castle would again be intimidated.

Although he believed that the demands of Dissenters for greater representation should have been met so as to dissuade them from pushing Catholic claims along with their own, Stewart joined his friend, president of the convention, the Earl of Charlemont in urging the Volunteers to receive their rebuff quietly.

Ascendant peer
In 1789 Robert Stewart was created Baron Londonderry in the Peerage of Ireland. Unable as a peer to himself avenge his defeat in 1783, for general election of 1790 he took his eldest son, Robert, out of Cambridge University to run for the county. Still able to persuade Down's Forty-shilling freeholders that the Stewarts were the friends of reform, the younger Stewart did so successfully albeit at considerable expense to his father.

Stewart deserted Presbyterianism for the Established Church, at what point is unclear but likely in advance of his elevation in 1795 to Viscount Castlereagh and the following year to Earl of Londonderry. His eldest son, now Viscount Castlereagh, also quietly converted to Anglicanism and was appointed Chief Secretary for Ireland to serve under Lady Frances's brother, Earl Camden, the Lord Lieutenant. Londonderry's second son, Charles, meanwhile kept the family present in the Irish Commons as member for Thomastown borough, County Kilkenny. Banking on these new establishment connections, and alarmed by the evident disaffection of their tenantry, Stewart reached an accommodation with the Hills: the families in future would divide the two county seats in Down, each returning a nominee to the parliament in Dublin unopposed.

Following a theft of gunpowder and grapeshot in Donaghdee, on 26 September 1796, Londonderry summoned his tenants to Mount Stewart to compel them to sweat as oath of allegiance. To the extent that he and his sons were prepared to consider reform, including further rights for Catholics, it was now to be within the more secure context of a union with Great Britain.  When in 1799 the parliament in Dublin rejected the bill for the Union they fought to have it re-presented.

With the bill's final passage, in 1801, Londonderry become one of the 28 original Irish representative peers in the new United Kingdom parliament at Westminster. In 1816, thanks to the advancing career of Castlereagh as Foreign Secretary, he was further elevated to Marquess of Londonderry. He thus achieved the rare feat of rising from a "Dissenting" (Presbyterian) commoner into the highest ranks of the Irish aristocracy.

1798, the execution of James Porter 
During their three-day "Republic" in Ards and north Down, 10–13 June 1798, the United Irish insurgents briefly occupied Mount Stewart. In August, the wife of the local Presbyterian minister, James Porter, appeared at the house with her seven children where they overwhelmed Lady Londonderry and young sister, then dying of tuberculosis, with a plea for his life. One of the children was later to recount that when Londonderry discovered his wife composing a letter to General Nugent, he insisted she add a postscript: "L does not allow me to interfere in Mr Porter's case. I cannot, therefore, and beg not to be mentioned. I only send the letter to gratify the humour",  i.e. to placate the distraught Mrs Porter to whom, with a smile that filed her with "much horror", Londonderry then handed the letter.

Londonderry was himself present at the court martial which had accepted dubious testimony to the minister's presence among the rebels, and was to see the sentence executed. Porter was hanged in sight both of his own meeting house at Greyabbey and of his family home (with Stewart tenants reportedly defying their landlord's wish that they attend). The Presbyterian minister Rev. Henry Montgomery of Killead, County Antrim, would later describe the circumstances of Porter's execution as being of "extreme cruelty towards both himself and his family, which were altogether unnecessary for any purpose of public example".

Londonderry was content that other offenders should be allowed exile. David Bailie Warden who commanded north Down rebels in the field; the Reverend Thomas Ledlie Birch, a United Irish firebrand who rallied with the rebels after the Battle of Saintfield; and William Sinclair who joined the tenantry in swearing loyalty before Londonderry yet served on the rebel Committee of Public Safety, were all permitted passage to the United States.

Porter's offence may have been his popular satire of the local landed interest, Billy Bluff, in which the master of Mount Stewart is clearly recognisable as the inarticulate tyrant "Lord Mountmumble". Porter had been aware that Billy Bluff might not go unpunished, acknowledging in its preface: "I am in danger of being hanged or put in gaol, perhaps both".

It may also be that Londonderry believed that Porter, who had been close to the family (their election agent and a frequent visitor to the Mount Stewart), had been a source of his wife's wayward, and potentially compromising, political sympathies. Lady Frances is rumoured to have continued to send privately for Porter's offending paper, the Northern Star, and in correspondence with Jane Greg (reputedly "head of the [United Irish] Female Societies" in Belfast) made bold to identify herself as a "republican countess".

Local tradition has it that Mrs. Porter waylaid his lordship's carriage, in a vain hope of prevailing by a further direct entreaty, but Londonderry bade the coachman "drive on." The sentence, however, was mitigated by remission of the order for quartering.

Reputation as landlord 
Despite political differences with his tenants, Londonderry did have a reputation as a comparatively generous landlord. He and his father rarely evicted tenants unless they were more than five years in arrears, and they abided by the Ulster custom of tenant right. They patronised the local town of Newtownards raising a subscription for a Catholic primary school as a gesture of ecumenical good will, and building a market house with a striking clock tower (a building which occupied by Scottish Fencibles was attacked by the rebels under Warden's command in 1798). During food shortages in 1800 and 1801, Londonderry at his own expense imported provisions into the stricken districts.

Death, succession, and timeline 
Lord Londonderry died on 6 April 1821 at Mount Stewart, County Down, and was buried at the Newtownards Priory, where his father already had been laid to rest. He was succeeded briefly as the 2nd Marquess of Londonderry by his eldest son Robert (Castlereagh) who took his own life the following year.

Notes and references

Notes

Citations

Sources 

 – Snippet view

 – L to M

 – Ireland and Scotland (for the drawing of the arms)
 - Scotland and Ireland
 (later events)
 – (for timeline)

 – (the subject as MP)
 – Viscounts, barons (for Bernard Ward, 1st Viscount Bangor)

 – (PDF downloadable from given URL)

|-

|-

|-

1739 births
1821 deaths
Irish MPs 1769–1776
Irish MPs 1776–1783
Irish representative peers
Members of the Irish House of Lords
Stewart, Robert
Members of the Privy Council of Ireland
1
Peers of Ireland created by George III
Robert